Philip Dulling (5 May 1909 – 1 September 1974) was an Australian cricketer. He played one first-class match for Tasmania in 1934/35.

See also
 List of Tasmanian representative cricketers

References

External links
 

1909 births
1974 deaths
Australian cricketers
Tasmania cricketers
Cricketers from Launceston, Tasmania